The Holland-on-Sea Residents' Association is a residents' association based in Holland-on-Sea, England.

References

External links
[http://www.hollandresidents.co.uk

Locally based political parties in England
Politics of Essex